KUNQ is a radio station airing a country music format licensed to Houston, Missouri, broadcasting on 99.3 MHz FM.  The station is owned by Justin Dixon, through licensee Media Professional, LLC.

History
The station signed on in May 1965 as KBTC-FM. It changed its call letters to KSCM-FM on January 22, 1972, and to KUNQ on September 8, 1987.

References

External links

Country radio stations in the United States
UNQ
Radio stations established in 1965
1965 establishments in Missouri